Waseca is a city in Waseca County, Minnesota, United States. The population was 9,410 at the 2010 census. It is the county seat.

Transportation
U.S. Highway 14 and Minnesota Highway 13 are two of the main routes in the city. U.S. 14 runs as an east–west freeway bypass just south of Waseca, while Minnesota Highway 13 passes through the city as State Street, running north–south.

Geography

Demographics

2010 census
As of the census of 2010, there were 9,410 people, 3,504 households, and 2,150 families living in the city. The racial makeup of the city was 89.0% White, 3.7% African American, 1.5% Native American, 1.0% Asian, 2.3% from other races, and 2.5% from two or more races. Hispanic or Latino of any race were 9.0% of the population.

There were 3,504 households, of which 30.9% had children under the age of 18 living with them, 44.7% were married couples living together, 11.7% had a female householder with no husband present, 5.0% had a male householder with no wife present, and 38.6% were non-families. 32.9% of all households were made up of individuals, and 13.8% had someone living alone who was 65 years of age or older. The average household size was 2.33 and the average family size was 2.95.

The median age in the city was 36.5 years. 22.5% of residents were under the age of 18; 8.3% were between the ages of 18 and 24; 30.1% were from 25 to 44; 25.5% were from 45 to 64; and 13.4% were 65 years of age or older. The gender makeup of the city was 42.6% male and 57.4% female.

2000 census
As of the 2000 census, there were 8,493 people, 3,388 households, and 2,219 families living in the city. The racial makeup of the city was 94.24% White, 1.39% African American, 0.35% Native American, 0.58% Asian, 0.05% Pacific Islander, 2.50% from other races, and 0.89% from two or more races. Hispanic or Latino of any race were 5.10% of the population.

The ancestral makeup of the city is 44.6% German, 21.3% Norwegian, 13.2% Irish, 5.2% English, 5.1% Swedish, and 4.6% French.
 
There were 3,388 households, out of which 34.0% had children under the age of 18 living with them, 50.6% were married couples living together, 10.8% had a female householder with no husband present, and 34.5% were non-families. 29.3% of all households were made up of individuals, and 11.8% had someone living alone who was 65 years of age or older. The average household size was 2.44 and the average family size was 3.02.

In the city, the population was spread out, with 27.0% under the age of 18, 9.4% from 18 to 24, 28.7% from 25 to 44, 19.4% from 45 to 64, and 15.6% who were 65 years of age or older. The median age was 36 years. For every 100 females, there were 92.6 males. For every 100 females age 18 and over, there were 88.1 males.

The median income for a household in the city was $39,554, and the median income for a family was $49,163. Males had a median income of $35,701 versus $22,837 for females. The per capita income for the city was $18,439. About 6.5% of families and 8.4% of the population were below the poverty line, including 12.5% of those under age 18 and 5.9% of those age 65 or over.

Education
Waseca is home to many schools. The school colors are blue and gold and the school mascot is the bluejay.

Hartley Elementary School has kindergarten through 3rd grade.

Waseca Intermediate School (WIS), known as Central Immediate School (CIS) until 2012, holds 4th grade through 6th grade.

Waseca Junior and Senior High School (WJSHS), known as Waseca High School (WHS) until 2012, houses grades 7 through 12. WHS served only grades 9 through 12.

Waseca Alternative High School (WALC), also known as the Alternative Learning Center (ALC), has an alternative learning program for students junior-high age through adult.

Sacred Heart School is a private Catholic elementary school, ranging from kindergarten through fourth grade, in Sacred Heart Catholic Church. Sacred Heart also has a Montessori preschool. Another preschool, Hansel & Gretel, is at Faith United Methodist Church. Other preschools include Waseca County Head Start.

Waseca has a charter school, TEAM Academy, hosting students from kindergarten to grade 6. Until recently, the public schools sponsored TEAM Academy.

Waseca was home to the University of Minnesota Waseca, a two-year technical college that closed in 1992. Most of its former campus continues to operate as the research facility Southern Research and Outreach Center, which includes 926 acres of research-oriented farmland, a community garden, and the Hodgson Memorial Arboretum.

Economy

Waseca is home to a frozen-vegetable packing plant for Birds Eye brand, owned by Pinnacle Foods, a subsidiary of Conagra.

The Federal Correctional Institution, Waseca, a low-security federal prison housing female inmates, is in buildings that were part of the University of Minnesota Waseca campus.

Waseca is home to the Waseca Medical Center, part of the Mayo Clinic Health System.

Recreation
Waseca opened a waterpark in June 2007.

Waseca completed an eight-foot-wide asphalt bike path surrounding Clear Lake in 2014.

Waseca is home to many parks and lakes, including Clear Lake, Loon Lake, Maplewood Park, Clear Lake Park, Loon Lake Park, Courthouse Park, and Blowers Park.

History
Waseca was platted in 1867 where the railroad system established a stop. Within a year it was a major shipping hub for wheat, and the city had 129 buildings and 700 people.

In 1912 the University of Minnesota purchased 246 acres of swampland and established an experimental farm called Southeast Station. Studies included corn, swine and cattle-breeding. In 1953 the university opened the Southern School of Agriculture for farming students. It operated as a boarding school, with a six-month term scheduled around farming activities. In 1971 it became the University of Minnesota Waseca, a two-year technical college, and served nearly 20,000 students before closing in 1992.

The city took its name from Waseca County, Minnesota. "Waseca" is a Dakota language word meaning "rich in provisions". It was founded as a hub of agricultural activity. In the mid-1900s, three companies were founded in Waseca with national markets: Brown Printing, EF Johnson Technologies Inc., and Herter's Outgoor Gear. The result was a strong, diverse economy. In the mid-1970s, Waseca's post office was the third busiest in the state for postal receipts.

In 1923, Edgar F. Johnson and his wife, Ethel Johnson, founded E.F. Johnson Co. It shared space with a downtown Waseca woodworking shop, and sold radio transmission parts by mail order. It built its first factory in 1936, and was a major supplier of defense production during World War II. Johnson merged with Western Union in 1982. In 1997, it was sold and its headquarters moved to Texas. The Johnsons played a major role in establishing Waseca County Historical Society.

George Herter launched Herter's in 1937 from his father's dry goods store and became an original model of successful mail-order retailers. Herter's merchandise is now sold by Cabela's and Bass Pro Shops. Herter's successful catalog business, including its print runs of 400,000 to 500,000 copies, were a major factor in Brown Printing's success. Brown Printing was started in 1949 and grew to include facilities in Illinois and Pennsylvania. It was sold to Quad Printing in 2015.

A post office has been in operation at Waseca since 1867. Waseca was incorporated as a city in 1881.

During the Second World War, the E.F. Johnson Company plant was on war footing, with production 24 hours a day and heavy surveillance. Waseca was one of the first cities to use municipal funds to buy war bonds.

On April 30, 1967, Waseca was severely damaged by the 1967 Iowa–Minnesota tornado outbreak.

Waseca has six properties on the National Register of Historic Places: the 1868 Philo C. Bailey House, the circa-1895 William R. Wolf House, the 1896 Roscoe P. Ward House, the 1897 John W. Aughenbaugh House, the 1897 Waseca County Courthouse, and the circa-1900 W. J. Armstrong Company Wholesale Grocers Building.

Past mayors of Waseca include: 
 William Grosvener Ward 
 Robert Laird McCormick (1874-1880)
 Warren Smith (1881-1882) 
 Marquis De Lafayette "M D L" Collester (1883-1883??)
 Gottfried Buchler (1886-1887)
 Eugene Belnap "E.B." Collester, (1887 to 1888)
 Towbridge
 D. S. Cummings (1888-1890)
 Col. D. E. Priest (1891-??)
 D. S. Cummings (1893-1896)
 John Moonan (1897-1898)
 Charles A. Smith (1898-1904)
 Bob Zehm 
 Bob Sien
 Avery "Doc" Hall (1975-1987)
 Richard Marcus (1988-1989)
 Steve Manthe (1989-1982)
 Judy Kozan (1992-1993)
 Steve Manthe (1993-1995)
 John Clemons (1995-2000)
 Tom Hagen (2000-2004)
 Roy Srp (2004-2014)
 John Clemons (2014-2016)
 Roy Srp (2016–2022)
 Randy Zimmerman (2023-Current)

Politics
Waseca is in Minnesota's 1st congressional district. It is represented in the Minnesota State Senate by John Jasinski and in the Minnesota House by John Petersburg. The current mayor is Randy Zimmerman.

Notable people
Reverend E.H. Alden, made famous in Laura Ingalls Wilder's series Little House on the Prairie
Joseph Alland, farmer and Minnesota state legislator
D. E. Bowe, member of Wisconsin State Assembly
Gene Glynn, former Minnesota Twins third base coach
George Herter, founder of Herter's outdoor goods business and author
Dave Kunst, the first person to walk around the world (from 1970 to 1974); his journey began and ended in Waseca.
John D. Lewer, farmer and Minnesota state legislator
George Peter Madden, lawyer and Minnesota state legislator
Ray J. Madden, U. S. Representative
Peter McGovern, member of Minnesota Senate
Tim Penny, U.S. Representative
Leroy Shield, composer, conductor, arranger of films featuring the Little Rascals and Laurel & Hardy, born in Waseca

References

External links

City of Waseca Official Website
Waseca School District Web site
 Discover Waseca

Cities in Waseca County, Minnesota
Cities in Minnesota
County seats in Minnesota
Dakota toponyms
1867 establishments in Minnesota
Populated places established in 1867